ISO/IEC JTC 1/SC 22 Programming languages, their environments and system software interfaces is a standardization subcommittee of the Joint Technical Committee ISO/IEC JTC 1 of the International Organization for Standardization (ISO) and the International Electrotechnical Commission (IEC) that develops and facilitates standards within the fields of programming languages, their environments and system software interfaces. ISO/IEC JTC 1/SC 22 is also sometimes referred to as the "portability subcommittee". The international secretariat of ISO/IEC JTC 1/SC 22 is the American National Standards Institute (ANSI), located in the United States.

History

ISO/IEC JTC 1/SC 22 was created in 1985, with the intention of creating a JTC 1 subcommittee that would address standardization within the field of programming languages, their environments and system software interfaces. Before the creation of ISO/IEC JTC 1/SC 22, programming language standardization was addressed by ISO TC 97/SC 5. Many of the original working groups of ISO/IEC JTC 1/SC 22 were inherited from a number of the working groups of ISO TC 97/SC 5 during its reorganization, including ISO/IEC JTC 1/SC 22/WG 2 – Pascal (originally ISO TC 97/SC 5/WG 4), ISO/IEC JTC 1/SC 22/WG 4 – COBOL (originally ISO TC 97/SC 5/ WG 8), and ISO/IEC JTC 1/SC 22/WG 5 – Fortran (originally ISO TC 97/SC 5/WG 9). Since then, ISO/IEC JTC 1/SC 22 has created and disbanded many of its working groups in response to the changing standardization needs of programming languages, their environments and system software interfaces.

Scope and mission
The scope of ISO/IEC JTC 1/SC 22 is the standardization of programming languages (such as COBOL, Fortran, Ada, C, C++, and Prolog), their environments (such as POSIX and Linux), and systems software interfaces, such as:
 Specification techniques
 Common facilities and interfaces

ISO/IEC JTC 1/SC 22 also produces common language-independent specifications to facilitate standardized bindings between programming languages and system services, as well as greater interaction between programs written in different languages. 

The scope of ISO/IEC JTC 1/SC 22 does not include specialized languages or environments within the program of work of other subcommittees or technical committees.

The mission of ISO/IEC JTC 1/SC 22 is to improve portability of applications, productivity and mobility of programmers, and compatibility of applications over time within high level programming environments. The three main goals of ISO/IEC JTC 1/SC 22 are:
 To support the current global investment in software applications through programming languages standardization
 To improve programming language standardization based on previous specification experience in the field
 To respond to emerging technological opportunities

Structure
Although ISO/IEC JTC 1/SC 22 has had a total of 24 working groups (WGs), many have been disbanded when the focus of the working group was no longer applicable to the current standardization needs. ISO/IEC JTC 1/SC 22 is currently made up of eight (8) active working groups, each of which carries out specific tasks in standards development within the field of programming languages, their environments and system software interfaces. The focus of each working group is described in the group’s terms of reference. Working groups of ISO/IEC JTC 1/SC 22 are:

Collaborations
ISO/IEC JTC 1/SC 22 works in close collaboration with a number of other organizations or subcommittees, some internal to ISO, and others external to it. Organizations in liaison with ISO/IEC JTC 1/SC 22, internal to ISO are:
 ISO/IEC JTC 1/SC 2, Coded character sets
 ISO/IEC JTC 1/SC 7, Software and systems engineering
 ISO/IEC JTC 1/SC 27, IT Security techniques
 ISO/TC 37, Terminology and other language and content resources
 ISO/TC 215, Health informatics

Organizations in liaison to ISO/IEC JTC 1/SC 22 that are external to ISO are:
 Ecma International
 Linux Foundation
 Association for Computing Machinery Special Interest Group on Ada (ACM SIGAda)
 Ada-Europe
 MISRA

Member countries
Countries pay a fee to ISO to be members of subcommittees.

The 23 "P" (participating) members of ISO/IEC JTC 1/SC 22 are: Austria, Bulgaria, Canada, China, Czech Republic, Denmark, Finland, France, Germany, Israel, Italy, Japan, Kazakhstan, Republic of Korea, Netherlands, Poland, Russian Federation, Slovenia, Spain, Switzerland, Ukraine, United Kingdom, and United States of America.

The 21 "O" (observing) members of ISO/IEC JTC 1/SC 22 are: Argentina, Belgium, Bosnia and Herzegovina, Cuba, Egypt, Ghana, Greece, Hungary, Iceland, India, Indonesia, Islamic Republic of Iran, Ireland, Democratic People’s Republic of Korea, Malaysia, New Zealand, Norway, Portugal, Romania, Serbia, and Thailand.

Published standards and technical reports
ISO/IEC JTC 1/SC 22 currently has 98 published standards in programming languages, their environments and system software interfaces. Some standards published by ISO/IEC JTC 1/SC 22 within this field include:

See also
 ISO/IEC JTC 1
 List of ISO standards
 American National Standards Institute
 International Organization for Standardization
 International Electrotechnical Commission

References

External links 
 ISO/IEC JTC 1/SC 22 page at ISO

022
Programming language standards